Johnny Boufarhat (born 1 June 1994) is an Australian-born British multi millionaire businessman who is the founder of virtual eventing platform, 
Hopin.

Early life and career 
Boufarhat was born on 1 June 1994 in Sydney, Australia to a Lebanese father who was a mechanical engineer and a Syrian-born Armenian mother who was an accountant. He received his early education from the Dubai American Academy. For further studies, he went to the United Kingdom and studied mechanical engineering at the University of Manchester. 

In January 2019, he founded Hopin. The platform gained popularity during the COVID-19 pandemic as people sought alternatives to in-person events. In August 2021, Hopin has raised $450 million through a funding round co-led by Arena Holdings and Altimeter Capital.

References

Living people
1994 births
British billionaires
British company founders
British people of Lebanese descent
British people of Armenian descent
Alumni of the University of Manchester
Businesspeople from Sydney